Neil Walton Gamble (born 17 January 1943) is a former English first-class cricketer.

Gamble was born at Macclesfield in Cheshire. He made his debut in minor counties cricket for Cheshire in 1965 against Northumberland at Macclesfield in the Minor Counties Championship. Later attending St Edmund Hall, Oxford, Gamble made his debut in first-class cricket for Oxford University in 1967 against Warwickshire at Oxford, with him featuring in thirteen first-class matches in 1967. In what was his only season of first-class cricket, Gamble scored 87 runs with a highest score of 24; with his medium pace he took 19 wickets at an average of 41.36, with best figures of 4/57. He continued to play minor counties cricket intermittently for Cheshire until 1973, making a total of twelve appearances in the Minor Counties Championship. After leaving Oxford, Gamble became a teacher in Derbyshire, Lancashire, Birmingham and Devon. He was the headteacher of King Edward V1 Aston, School and Exeter School. He became CEO of Devon County Cricket Club in 2010 and Chairman in 2016.

References

External links
Neil Gamble at ESPNcricinfo

1943 births
Living people
Sportspeople from Macclesfield
Alumni of St Edmund Hall, Oxford
English cricketers
Cheshire cricketers
Oxford University cricketers
Schoolteachers from Cheshire